Richard E. Cellon is a Rear Admiral in the U.S. Navy is in command of the 1st Naval Construction Division.

Prior to his current position, he was commanded the Naval Facilities Engineering facility in Pearl Harbor.  He also led the Naval Mobile Construction Battalion.

Education
 Bachelor's degree from the US Naval Academy
 Master's degree from the University of Florida
 Master's degree from the Naval War College
 Post-graduate degree work at the University of Pennsylvania

See also

References 

United States Navy rear admirals
University of Florida alumni
Living people
Year of birth missing (living people)
Recipients of the Legion of Merit
Recipients of the Defense Superior Service Medal